Survive! (Spanish: Supervivientes de los Andes - Andes Survivors) is a 1976 Mexican thriller film directed by René Cardona. The film was released on January 15, 1976 in Mexico and is based on the 1973 book Survive! by Clay Blair, which is based on the story of Uruguayan Air Force Flight 571.

Premise
A Uruguayan rugby team crashes in the Andes Mountains and has to survive the extremely cold temperatures and rough climate. As some of the people die, the survivors are forced to make a terrible decision between starvation and cannibalism.

Cast
 Hugo Stiglitz as Francisco
 Norma Lazareno as Silvia
 Luz María Aguilar as Mrs. Madero
 Fernando Larrañaga as Madero
 Pablo Ferrel as Raúl
 Leonardo Daniel as Carmelo
 Sara Guasch as Mamá de Silvia
 Gloria Chávez as Mujer que va a boda (as Gloria Chaves)
 José Elías Moreno as Rodrigo Fernández

Reception
The New York Times gave a negative review for Survive!, calling it "an irksomely dubbed film of rudimentary exposition with a sometimes tinny musical accompaniment". Roger Ebert gave the film zero stars, saying, "In most movies featuring a lot of blood and cuts and close-ups of festering wounds and all that, the typical audience laughs to break the tension (horror movies almost always play as comedies). With Survive! though, the audience tends to be a little more sober, a little more thoughtful. Maybe that's because we realize that underlying this rather dumb, uninspired, even crude film is a true story of such compelling power that we're forced to think and respond."

Over the Labor Day weekend 1976, the film opened in Chicago and grossed $1,060,000 from 63 theaters which propelled it to number one at the US box office.

See also
 Alive (1993)

Notes

References

External links
 
 

Estudios Churubusco films
1976 films
1970s Spanish-language films
Mexican disaster films
Mexican thriller drama films
1970s thriller drama films
Films based on American novels
Films about aviation accidents or incidents
Drama films based on actual events
Films based on non-fiction books
Films set in Uruguay
Uruguayan Air Force Flight 571
Films about cannibalism
Films scored by Gerald Fried
Cultural depictions of Uruguayan men
Cultural depictions of rugby footballers
Works about cannibals
1976 drama films
1970s English-language films
1970s Mexican films